The 18th District of the Iowa Senate is located in southern Iowa, and is currently composed of Polk County.

Current elected officials
Janet Petersen is the senator currently representing the 18th District.

The area of the 18th District contains two Iowa House of Representatives districts:
The 35th District (represented by Ako Abdul-Samad)
The 36th District (represented by Marti Anderson)

The district is also located in Iowa's 3rd congressional district, which is represented by Cindy Axne.

Past senators
The district has previously been represented by:

Robert Carr, 1983–1989
Mike Connolly, 1990–2002
Mary Lundby, 2003–2008
Swati Dandekar, 2009–2011
Liz Mathis, 2012
Janet Petersen, 2013–present

See also
Iowa General Assembly
Iowa Senate

References

18